Diphtheroptila is a genus of moths in the family Gracillariidae.

Species
Diphtheroptila brideliae Vári, 1961
Diphtheroptila ochridorsellum (Meyrick, 1880) 
Diphtheroptila oxyloga (Meyrick, 1928)

External links
Global Taxonomic Database of Gracillariidae (Lepidoptera) 

Gracillariinae
Gracillarioidea genera